Leonard Fell (died 1700), was an English Quaker.

Life
Fell was the son of Thomas Fell, gentleman, of Beckliff, or Baycliff, Lancashire (now Cumbria), and in his early life occupied some position of trust in the house of his relative, Thomas Fell, at Swarthmoor. He appears to have become a Quaker in 1652. Between 1654 and 1657 he was repeatedly sent to prison for interrupting services, and in 1661 was imprisoned for some religious offence at Leicester. Most of his time seems to have been spent in preaching excursions, although till 1665 at least he retained his situation at Swarthmore, and in this year he was imprisoned in Lancaster Castle for being at an illegal conventicle. He had some property at Addingham, Cumberland, and in 1666 was sent to prison at the suit of the vicar of that place for refusing to pay tithes, but owing to the vicar's death he was discharged within a fortnight.

He suffered a long imprisonment in 1668 for having attended a meeting at Swarthmore and then refusing the oaths, and in 1672 he was again imprisoned for refusing to pay tithes to Theo. Aimes, vicar of Baycliff, but was a second time released by the death of his suitor. For preaching at a meeting on the shore of Windermere he was fined, and two years later was fined again by the justices of Westmoreland for the same offence. In the intervals between his imprisonments he was engaged in ministerial work, chiefly in the northern counties and in Wales, and his preaching is said to have been of an earnest and loving character rather than argumentative or doctrinal. In September 1684 he was sent to gaol for more than a month for absenting himself from the parish church, and immediately after his release was again arrested and incarcerated for about eight weeks for the same offence.

In 1699 Fell went on a preaching tour in northern England, with Benjamin Holme and Joseph Kirkbride. He died while on a preaching excursion at Darlington in 1700, having been a minister nearly fifty years.

He is known to have been married, but had no family. His character was amiable rather than strong, but on occasion he could be fearless. It is said that being once plundered by a highwayman, he said that though he would not give his life for his horse or money, he would for the robber's soul, whereupon the man returned both horse and money. Fell was a man of little education.

Works
Fell wrote:

The Persecution of them People they call Quakers in several places in Lancashire (with W. Adamson), 1656.
An Epistle for the Strengthening and Confirming of Friends in their Most Holy Faith, 1670. 
A Warning to England in general and the cities of London and Bristol in particular, 1693. 
 My Testimony to my Dear, True, and Well-beloved Friend and Father in Christ, George Fox, written 1691, printed 1706.

References

17th-century births
1700 deaths
English Quakers
Converts to Quakerism
17th-century English writers
17th-century English male writers
English religious writers
17th-century Protestants
Clergy from Lancashire
Quaker writers
17th-century Quakers
People from Ulverston